Gordon Jackson may refer to:

Gordon Jackson (actor) (1923–1990), Scottish actor
Gordon Jackson (businessman) (1924–1991), Australian businessman
Gordon Jackson (politician) (born 1948), Member of the Scottish Parliament